Les Avants (Montreux) is a village in the canton of Vaud in Switzerland. It is located in the municipality of Montreux, in the east of the canton, in the district of Riviera-Pays-d’Enhaut.

History and description
Les Avants is a winter resort in the Vaud Alps. The village was developed as a ski resort in the 19th century by the Dufour family. They constructed the ski slopes and built a hotel, Grand Hotel des Avants, to accommodate visitors. In 1872, an Anglican chapel was built in the grounds of the hotel for the benefit of English visitors. The village hosted the first Ice Hockey European Championship, in 1910 and gives its name to the Chemin de fer Les Avants – Sonloup. Opened in 1901 as the first stage of the Montreux-Oberland Bernois, it connects Montreux to Les Avants and Sonloup,  to the northwest. The hotel closed after the Second World War and has since served as a school, currently Le Châtelard international boarding school. Ernest Hemingway stayed at the resort in the 1920s, and recalls the village in his memoir, A Moveable Feast.

Notable residents
The village was home to the opera singer Dame Joan Sutherland and her husband, the conductor Richard Bonynge, who lived at the Chalet Monet. Sutherland’s home was found for her by Noël Coward, a long-time friend and fellow resident of Les Avants. Coward had bought his own home, further down the mountain from Chalet Monet, in August 1959. Having toyed with the idea of calling the house Shilly Chalet, Coward adopted the local rendition of his own name, Chalet Covar. After Coward’s death at Firefly, their other home in Jamaica, in 1973, his partner Graham Payn lived at the chalet until his own death in 2005.

References

Sources
 

Villages in Switzerland
Villages in the canton of Vaud